Word•Flesh•Stone is an EP by Will, released in October 26, 1992 by Third Mind Records. In an interview with Music From the Empty Quarter, Rhys Fulber said he was more pleased with the music Word•Flesh•Stone as it was more representative of the band's sound when it was released in contrast to Pearl of Great Price, which was recorded over a three-year period.

Track listing

Personnel
Adapted from the Word•Flesh•Stone liner notes.

Will
 Rhys Fulber – keyboard, drum programming, production, engineering
 John McRae – vocals, art direction
 Chris Peterson – keyboard, production, engineering

Production and additional personnel
 Michael Balch – engineering
 John Dennison – photography

References

External links 
 

1992 EPs
Will (band) albums
Third Mind Records EPs
Albums produced by Rhys Fulber
Albums produced by Chris Peterson (producer)